Mayne may refer to:

People
 Andrew Mayne, magician and filmmaker
 Brent Mayne (born 1968), American Baseball catcher
 Chris Mayne (born 1988), professional Australian rules footballer
 Clarice Mayne (1886–1966), British music hall and variety theatre singer and performer
 Cuthbert Mayne (1544–1577), English Roman Catholic priest and martyr
 Edgar Mayne (1882–1961), Australian cricketer
 Edith Mayne (born 1905), British freestyle swimmer
 Edward Mayne (1756–1829), Irish judge
 Ferdy Mayne (1916–1998), German-British actor
 Frederick Allen Mayne III (born 1970), birth name of American singer Fred Durst
 James O'Neil Mayne, Australian philanthropist 
 Jasper Mayne (1604–1672), British clergyman, translator, minor poet and dramatist
 John Mayne (1759–1836), Scottish printer, journalist and poet 
 Kenny Mayne (born 1959), American sports journalist
 Laurie Mayne (born 1942), Australian cricketer
 Lonnie Mayne (1943–1978), American professional wrestler

 Mary Emelia Mayne (1858–1940), Australian philanthropist 
 Michael Mayne (1929 -2006), Dean of Westminster
 Mosley Mayne (1889–1955), British Indian Army officer
 Paddy Mayne (1915–1955), Northern Irish soldier and athlete 
Patrick Mayne, Australian butcher and alderman
 Richard Mayne (1796–1868), first joint Commissioner of the Metropolitan Police
 Richard Mayne (administrator) (1926–2009), British international civil servant, writer

 Richard Charles Mayne (1835–1892), Royal Navy officer prominent in the history of British Columbia
 Roger Mayne (born 1929), English photographer
 Seymour Mayne (born 1944), Canadian poet and literary translator
 Simon Mayne (1612–1661), Member of Parliament and one of the regicides of King Charles I of England
 Stephen Mayne (born 1969), Australian journalist
 Thom Mayne (born 1944), American architect
 Thomas Mayne (disambiguation)
 Wiley Mayne (1917–2007), American politician
 William Mayne (1928–2010), British children's fiction author
 William Cyril Mayne (1877–1962), English clergyman and classical scholar

Places

Australia 

 Mayne, Queensland, a neighbourhood in the City of Brisbane

Canada 

 Mayne Island, British Columbia, Canada
Mayne Island Water Aerodrome
Mayne Queen, the ferry that serves the island

Ireland 
Mayne, County Westmeath, a townland in Mayne civil parish, barony of Fore, County Westmeath, Ireland
 Mayne, County Westmeath (civil parish), a civil parish in the barony of Fore, County Westmeath, Ireland

United Kingdom 
 Mayne Preceptory, a priory in Dorset, England

Organisations
 Mayne Australian Football Club, Queensland
 Mayne Coaches, English 
 Mayne Group, former Australian healthcare & logistics company

See also
 Maine
 Main (disambiguation)
 Maynes (disambiguation)

English-language surnames